Husk (Paige Guthrie) is a character appearing in American comic books published by Marvel Comics. Guthrie is a superhero associated with the X-Men.

A mutant, Husk has the ability to remove one layer of skin—or "husk"—revealing an epidermis of a different composition beneath. She often changes into metal or stone form, but can shift into a variety of substances.

Husk is from a Kentucky coal mining family and is the younger sister of the X-Men's Cannonball. Unlike her brother, Husk is self-conscious of being seen as a "hick" (Jubilee often called her "hayseed"). As a member of the X-Men's 1990s-era junior team Generation X, she established herself as an overachiever. She later joined the X-Men.

Publication history
Husk first made appearances as a background character and one of Cannonball's many siblings in Rom Annual #3 (1984) by Bill Mantlo and William Johnson and The New Mutants #42 (1986) by Chris Claremont and Jackson Guice. She was revealed as a mutant and her personality was developed by Fabian Nicieza and Tony Daniel in X-Force #32 (1994) as part of that title's Child's Play crossover with New Warriors, which segued into her participation in the Generation Next arc of the Phalanx Covenant, running through X-Men #36-37 (1994) and The Uncanny X-Men #317 (1994).

Husk would then become a permanent member of Generation X (1994–2001), originally created by Scott Lobdell and Chris Bachalo. This run defined and expanded her personality and mutant abilities. After Generation X disbanded, Husk served as a member of the X-Men in The Uncanny X-Men #414-443 (2002–2004), thereafter appearing sporadically as a reserve member and background character in various X-titles, highlighted by a mission during the Necrosha event in X-Men: Legacy #231-233 (2010).

During the X-Men's Schism, Husk joined Cannonball and threw in with Wolverine's side in X-Men: Regenesis #1, becoming a faculty member at the Jean Grey School in Westchester. Husk appears regularly as a supporting character in Wolverine and the X-Men (2012) from issue #2 onward.

Fictional character biography
The sister of the X-Man Cannonball, Paige Guthrie was born to a large Kentucky coal miner's family. Her father died when she was very young, due to a lung affliction  from working in the mines. As a teenager, she discovers her inborn mutant ability to shed her skin, metamorphosing into a different composition beneath. She has used this power to turn her body into stone, glass, and an acid-like substance, among other materials. She can also use her power to heal herself by shedding a damaged form in favor of an intact one. She normally cannot change the shape of her form, only its composition, although an issue of X-Force, written before her powers had been fully defined, depicted her transforming into a bird.

Generation X
From the series' beginning in 1994 until its cancellation at issue #75 in 2001, Husk was a member of the junior X-Men team Generation X, where she earned a reputation as a workaholic, constantly trying to prove herself fit for the main team.  She also develops a troubled relationship with her antisocial teammate Chamber. Towards the end of the team's existence, Paige became the group's computer expert and develops an interest in environmental issues.

After the breakup of Generation X, Husk joins Banshee's militant X-Corps, along with other Gen X members, to keep an eye on him. This does not end well, with Banshee's more criminal charges staging a coup and the Gen X members having to take down the Blob.

X-Men
She later joined the X-Men in Chuck Austen's 2001 revamp of Uncanny X-Men and was placed in a controversial relationship with the long-time X-Man Archangel, as Husk was 19 years old and several years Archangel's junior.

The two took an extended leave of absence.  Archangel launched a charity called "Mutantes Sans Frontières" in Zanzibar, a reference to Médecins Sans Frontières ("Doctors Without Borders"), where the two proceeded to help stop a coup with the aid of Professor X's newest charges from nearby Genosha.

Her younger brother Jay later joined the new New Mutants team under the codename Icarus. Her sister Melody also joined the school as Aero after discovering she could fly. Melody has since been depowered after M-Day, although Paige herself retains her powers. Icarus was later killed following the events of M-Day, in a confrontation with the anti-mutant activist William Stryker and his army. The resulting battles also take the lives of dozens of other students.

She is most often seen in the current New X-Men title while tending to the wounded. In her last major appearance, she attended the funeral of her little brother.

Divided We Stand
The first issue of Divided We Stand revealed that Paige had returned to living with her family. She is the one who picks up her brother, Cannonball, at the airport to bring him home. However, Sam, still feeling angry over the betrayal of his X-Men team, tells her to take him to a local bar, where he picks a fight with the members of rival families from their home. Paige confronts Sam on his action after the brawl ends. Sam yells that he's lost faith in how the life of an X-Men works and flies off angry, leaving Paige fearful for his life and mind.

Secret Invasion
Husk is seen fighting alongside the rest of the X-Men in San Francisco and flirting with Angel at the same time, though it would appear they are no longer a couple.

Nation X/Necrosha
Paige is a resident of the mutant nation of Utopia and is seen fighting alongside the New X-Men battling her reanimated former teammates Synch and Skin. Paige is subsequently sent to Muir Island with a team of X-Men led by Nightcrawler to further investigate the attacks on Utopia. When the team reaches Muir Island, they discover something came back when Destiny was resurrected - the villain Proteus. Proteus takes swift action, dispatching the teams heavy-hitters Colossus and Magneto and possessing Trance, Nightcrawler, Psylocke and Husk. While in mental possession of Husk, he displays the ability to assume a flaming energy form, something Paige was previously unable to do. Whether this is an undiscovered latent power of Paige's or an aspect of Proteus's reality manipulation remains unknown.

Second Coming
Paige was seen fighting a Nimrod with Roberto DaCosta, Avalanche and Boom-Boom and then again after the Nimrods were depowered (due to Cypher). She asked Colossus what happened and he replied, "I don't know, Paige".

Schism
Following the conflict between Wolverine and Cyclops that led to the former abandoning Utopia, Husk became a teacher at the Jean Grey School for Higher Learning. At a faculty meeting, Paige tries to express her insecurity about not being cut out for teaching because the students aren't listening to her. Ironically, Beast cuts her off before she can finish. Later, Cannonball expresses his frustration about there only being a memorial for dead X-Men, including their brother Jay, in the faculty lounge and that he doesn't understand how Paige agrees with this decision when she can't even look at Jay's picture. Casting off Sam's feelings, Paige announces she has class and needs to change. In reply to this, Sam states that she sheds her skin every time she's unhappy and her power isn't an antidepressant. At that moment, the school is attacked, and Paige is instructed to go teach as normal. During her class, Rogue interrupts and informs Paige that there is a problem with the "heating system". Upon leaving the class, Paige instantly husks into her fire form and destroys the invading N'Garai in the mansion. During Paige's time at the school, it becomes apparent that her mysterious molting condition is only worsening because her skin is in a state of constant cracking and flaking.

Leaving the X-Men
Over time, Paige's condition worsens as she starts leaving around Husk replicas with her old skin (replicas that Toad, in love with her, keeps to himself and even uses in his tea parties). During the events of Avengers vs. X-Men, she starts a sentimental relationship with him. Her mental condition grows worse too, and she doesn't even acknowledge a riot in one of her classes. After that, Kitty Pryde states that Paige is in no condition to teach and suggests removing her from the active staff. In a burst of fury, Paige decides to quit the school, considering Kitty was about to fire her. Then, Paige decides to take some time for herself, leaving the school and telling Toad she will eventually come back. She even assures him she is in no need of psychiatric help.

As part of the Marvel NOW! event, a now-disfigured Husk is revealed to be one of the agents of the Hellfire Club's new Hellfire Academy.

When Toad helps Quentin Quire to escape the Hellfire Academy, Husk and the other students try to stop them. Husk attacks Toad and strangles him, when he starts ripping off layer after layer of her skin until a normal looking Paige appears under all the husks. She has only vague memories of what happened, and does not remember her relationship with Toad. The X-Men shut down the Hellfire Academy.

It transpires that Husk's personality shifts and subsequent mental breakdown and betrayal where caused by a secondary mutation which means her powers now also affect her mind as well as her body. Husk is forgiven for her betrayal since she was of unsound mind and is made the academy's new guidance counselor, however Toad is fired. As he is leaving Husk apologizes to him for being unable to remember what happened between them, he claims he knew it was too good to last. Before he leaves she arranges a date at a local coffee shop, but the city is attacked by self-replicating energy bots built by Maximilian Frankenstein so he and Manuel Endque could escape the Grey Academy. The X-Men defeat the robots, and half the coffee shop has been destroyed. Endque was found by the X-Men having been severely beaten by Toad on Frankenstein's orders, Toad seemingly now working for Frankenstein, wanting to go someplace nobody can hurt them. Endque passes on a message to Husk that Toad left because he knew even if things went well between them one day she'd wake up and see him for what he really was. Husk breaks down in tears.

Powers and abilities
Paige is a metamorph who has the mutant ability to change her physical form by shedding her outer layer of skin to reveal a new layer or shape underneath. While she can sometimes acquire new forms, Paige most commonly takes on a Paige-like form in a new material. She can become any solid that she has studied (including glass, wood, rubber, brick, diamond, granite, and even adamantium). These forms take on new physical abilities or qualities appropriate to the form, such as increased weight, strength, or invulnerability. Paige has shown some ability to take on forms with energy powers - including a fiery form that generates heat and flame, and a form with acidic skin.

Husk has been able to shift into anything that does not exceed her body mass. Any extra mass left when she shifts into a smaller form such as an insect or a bird is shunted into an unknown extra-dimensional space, and will return to Husk when she resumes her human form. However, she has also demonstrated an ability to take on extra mass and become heavier. She has the capability to blend in with surroundings, but to do so, she would have to study the texture she seeks to mimic first. She can husk away minor injuries, but deeper ones will stay with her. She can hold a form for about an hour before she needs to revert to her original form. She can morph repeatedly. She is not required to stay in any one form, but too many transformations can become very painful. In great stress or trauma, Paige can shed without control, revealing patchwork forms. When Paige 'husks', she sheds her clothing as well, this has the side effect of leaving her nude when she returns to her normal form.

Paige has recently gained a secondary mutation which affects her mind. This mutation changes parts of her brain into acting into what she herself shifts into. Paige has learned to keep it under control as the first time Toad had to tear through several husks for Paige to regain her mind but in the process she lost several months of memories likely due to the constant shedding.

Reception
 In 2014, Entertainment Weekly ranked Husk 15th in their "Let's rank every X-Man ever" list.
 In 2018, CBR.com ranked Husk 9th in their "20 Most Powerful Mutants From The '80s" list.

Other versions

Age of Apocalypse

In the Age of Apocalypse, Paige was a member of Generation Next. Husk was found by Sinister along with her older sister Elizabeth and her older brother Samuel while the rest of their family, save for their youngest brother Joshua, were culled by Apocalypse's Infinites. However, unlike Sam and Elizabeth, Paige declined Sinister's offer to join his Elite Mutant Force. Instead she joined Magneto's cause. Like her main Marvel Universe counterpart, Paige had a long-term relationship with Chamber, though in this case the relationship became physical as well.

Paige demonstrates greater control over her abilities compared to her primary-universe counterpart. She is able to transform all parts of her body, and was capable of adopting liquid, gaseous, and energy states. Paige can also adapt "bio patterns" to affect specific individuals, including a complex acid that could affect the organic steel skin of Colossus and an energy form Shadowcat could not phase through. She also had the ability to change only part of her body (such as changing a hand into a bladed weapon).

After being overrun deep in hostile territory, Paige and her Generation Next fleet team members were believed to be dead. Paige survived the battle and was enslaved by the inmates of the Seattle Core until Apocalypse's regime fully collapsed. Husk was eventually found by her siblings and was taken to Sinister, who took his time to corrupt her and made her want revenge for the X-Men. Husk infiltrated the ranks of the X-Men as a mutant named Xorn and kidnapped Charles Lensherr; she even battled alongside the other Guthries, but was ultimately killed by Wolverine's daughter, Kirika.

Age of X
In the Age of X reality Paige is seen breaking free of mutant hunters killing many of them and later meeting up with her brother, Sam. They both find their entire family dead because of the mutant hunters. She swears vengeance on the humans who did this.

Age of X-Man
In the Age of X-Man reality, Paige Guthrie is the Agriculture Instructor of the 10th Year class within the Summers Institute Of Higher Learning, located in Winchester, NY.

Mutant X
Paige is a member of the Marauders and constantly fighting with her brother, Cannonball. She is stuck in a rather grotesque form and was last seen trying to escape the group's mysterious benefactor.

Ultimate Marvel
In the Ultimate Marvel reality, Paige Guthrie is a fourteen-year-old mutant living in the Southwest, which is overrun by Sentinels. She meets Kitty Pryde and her X-Men, and leads them to Nick Fury. She later assists Kitty Pryde in her efforts to shut down nearby makeshift mutant internment camps.

In other media

Television
 Husk, alongside Cannonball, appears in the X-Men episode "Hidden Agenda".

Film
 Husk's name appears in William Stryker's computer in the 2003 film X2.

References

External links
 
 UncannyXmen.net Spotlight on Husk

Characters created by Bill Mantlo
Characters created by Chris Claremont
Characters created by Fabian Nicieza
Characters created by Tony S. Daniel
Comics characters introduced in 1984
Fictional characters from Kentucky
Marvel Comics characters who are shapeshifters
Marvel Comics female superheroes
Marvel Comics martial artists
Marvel Comics mutants